Regulation (EU) No 1169/2011 on the provision of food information to consumers  is the main law relating to food information in the European Union. There are other EU laws that specify the rules for particular types of foods.

The principles governing mandatory food information is in Article 4, and the list of mandatory particulars in Article 9. Any Union measure in the field of food information law which is likely to have an effect on public health shall be adopted after consultation with the European Food Safety Authority, per Article 5. Further, food information shall not be misleading, per Article 7. Rules on naming food are provided in Article 17.

Article 15 (language requirements) provides that “mandatory food information shall appear in a language easily understood by the consumers of the Member States where a food is marketed. [...] Within their own territory, the Member States in which a food is marketed may stipulate that the particulars shall be given in one or more languages from among the official languages of the Union.”

Vegetarian food
In 2019, news reports suggested that this regulation (in particular Article 17) prevented the use of vegetarian food labels in the EU, such as the common terms veggie burger, vegetarian sausage, and so forth.

Notes

References

External links
Regulation (EU) No 1169/2011 on EUR-Lex

European Union food law
European Union regulations
1169 2011
Food packaging